Füssli is a Swiss-German surname. Notable people with the surname include:

 Henry Fuseli (1741–1825), Swiss-born British painter
 Johann Caspar Füssli (1706–1782), Swiss portrait painter
 Johann Kaspar Füssli (1743–1786), Swiss entomologist

See also
 Orell Füssli, Swiss bookshop and publisher

Swiss-German surnames